A multifractal system is a generalization of a fractal system in which a single exponent (the fractal dimension) is not enough to describe its dynamics; instead, a continuous spectrum of exponents (the so-called singularity spectrum) is needed.

Multifractal systems are common in nature. They include the length of coastlines, mountain topography, fully developed turbulence, real-world scenes, heartbeat dynamics, human gait  and activity, human brain activity, and natural luminosity time series. Models have been proposed in various contexts ranging from turbulence in fluid dynamics to internet traffic, finance, image modeling, texture synthesis, meteorology, geophysics and more. The origin of multifractality in sequential (time series) data has been attributed to mathematical convergence effects related to the central limit theorem that have as foci of convergence the family of statistical distributions known as the Tweedie exponential dispersion models, as well as the geometric Tweedie models.  The first convergence effect yields monofractal sequences, and the second convergence effect is responsible for variation in the fractal dimension of the monofractal sequences.

Multifractal analysis is used to investigate datasets, often in conjunction with other methods of fractal and lacunarity analysis. The technique entails distorting datasets extracted from patterns to generate multifractal spectra that illustrate how scaling varies over the dataset. Multifractal analysis has been used to decipher the generating rules and functionalities of complex networks. Multifractal analysis techniques have been applied in a variety of practical situations, such as predicting earthquakes and interpreting medical images.

Definition 
In a multifractal system , the behavior around any point is described by a local power law:

The exponent  is called the singularity exponent, as it describes the local degree of singularity or regularity around the point .

The ensemble formed by all the points that share the same singularity exponent is called the singularity manifold of exponent h, and is a fractal set of fractal dimension  the singularity spectrum. The curve  versus  is called the singularity spectrum and fully describes the statistical distribution of the variable .

In practice, the multifractal behaviour of a physical system  is not directly characterized by its singularity spectrum . Rather, data analysis gives access to the multiscaling exponents . Indeed, multifractal signals generally obey a scale invariance property that yields power-law behaviours for multiresolution quantities, depending on their scale . For multifractal objects, one usually observes a global power-law scaling of the form:

at least in some range of scales and for some range of orders . When such behaviour is observed, one talks of scale invariance, self-similarity, or multiscaling.

Estimation 

Using so-called multifractal formalism, it can be shown that, under some well-suited assumptions, there exists a correspondence between the singularity spectrum  and the multi-scaling exponents  through a Legendre transform. While the determination of  calls for some exhaustive local analysis of the data, which would result in difficult and numerically unstable calculations, the estimation of the  relies on the use of statistical averages and linear regressions in log-log diagrams.

Multifractal systems are often modeled by stochastic processes such as multiplicative cascades. This evolution is often called statistical intermittency and betrays a departure from Gaussian models.

Modelling as a multiplicative cascade also leads to estimation of multifractal properties.  This methods works reasonably well, even for relatively small datasets. A maximum likely fit of a multiplicative cascade to the dataset not only estimates the complete spectrum but also gives reasonable estimates of the errors.

Estimating multifractal scaling from box counting 

Multifractal spectra can be determined from box counting on digital images. First, a box counting scan is done to determine how the pixels are distributed; then, this "mass distribution" becomes the basis for a series of calculations.
 

 = an arbitrary scale (box size in box counting) at which the set is examined

 = the index for each box laid over the set for an 

 = the number of pixels or mass in any box, at size 

 = the total boxes that contained more than 0 pixels, for each 

 = an arbitrary range of values to use as exponents for distorting the data set

When ,  equals 1, the usual sum of all probabilities, and when , every term is equal to 1, so the sum is equal to the number of boxes counted, .

These distorting equations are further used to address how the set behaves when scaled or resolved or cut up into a series of -sized pieces and distorted by Q, to find different values for the dimension of the set, as in the following:

 
For the generalized dimension:

 

 is estimated as the slope of the regression line for  versus  where:

The mean  is estimated as the slope of the log-log regression line for  versus , where:

In practice, the probability distribution depends on how the dataset is sampled, so optimizing algorithms have been developed to ensure adequate sampling.

Applications 
Multifractal analysis has been successfully used in many fields, including physical, information, and biological sciences. For example, the quantification of residual crack patterns on the surface of reinforced concrete shear walls.

Dataset distortion analysis 

Multifractal analysis has been used in several scientific fields to characterize various types of datasets. In essence, multifractal analysis applies a distorting factor to datasets extracted from patterns, to compare how the data behave at each distortion. This is done using graphs known as multifractal spectra, analogous to viewing the dataset through a "distorting lens", as shown in the illustration. Several types of multifractal spectra are used in practise.

DQ vs Q 

One practical multifractal spectrum is the graph of DQ vs Q, where DQ is the generalized dimension for a dataset and Q is an arbitrary set of exponents. The expression generalized dimension thus refers to a set of dimensions for a dataset (detailed calculations for determining the generalized dimension using box counting are described below).

Dimensional ordering 
The general pattern of the graph of DQ vs Q can be used to assess the scaling in a pattern. The graph is generally decreasing, sigmoidal around Q=0, where D(Q=0) ≥ D(Q=1) ≥ D(Q=2). As illustrated in the figure, variation in this graphical spectrum can help distinguish patterns. The image shows D(Q) spectra from a multifractal analysis of binary images of non-, mono-, and multi-fractal sets. As is the case in the sample images, non- and mono-fractals tend to have flatter D(Q) spectra than multifractals.

The generalized dimension also gives important specific information. D(Q=0) is equal to the capacity dimension, which—in the analysis shown in the figures here—is the box counting dimension. D(Q=1) is equal to the information dimension, and D(Q=2) to the correlation dimension. This relates to the "multi" in multifractal, where multifractals have multiple dimensions in the D(Q) versus Q spectra, but monofractals stay rather flat in that area.

f(α) versus α 
Another useful multifractal spectrum is the graph of  versus  (see calculations). These graphs generally rise to a maximum that approximates the fractal dimension at Q=0, and then fall. Like DQ versus Q spectra, they also show typical patterns useful for comparing non-, mono-, and multi-fractal patterns. In particular, for these spectra, non- and mono-fractals converge on certain values, whereas the spectra from multifractal patterns typically form humps over a broader area.

Generalized dimensions of species abundance distributions in space 
One application of  Dq versus Q in ecology is characterizing the distribution of species. Traditionally the relative species abundances is calculated for an area without taking into account the locations of the individuals. An equivalent representation of relative species abundances are species ranks, used to generate a surface called the species-rank surface, which can be analyzed using generalized dimensions to detect different ecological mechanisms like the ones observed in the neutral theory of biodiversity, metacommunity dynamics, or niche theory.

See also 
 Fractional Brownian motion
 Detrended fluctuation analysis
 Tweedie distributions
 Markov switching multifractal
 Weighted planar stochastic lattice (WPSL)

References

Further reading

External links

 Movies of visualizations of multifractals

Fractals
Dimension theory